Brook Lapping Productions is a British TV and radio production company. Based in London, Brook Lapping is a subsidiary of Ten Alps.

The company is the result of a 1997 merger of Brook Associates (founded in 1982), and Brian Lapping Associates.

Filmography 
Inside Obama's White House (2016) (BBC)
The Iraq War (2013)
Putin, Russia & The West (2011)
Iran and the West (2009) (BBC)
Attack on the Pentagon (2008) (Discovery)
Revealed: The Great Olympic Drug Scandal (2007) (Five)
Ocean of Fear: Worst Shark Attack Ever (2007) (Discovery)
The Rise and Fall of Tony Blair (2007) (Channel 4)
Jackie Magazine: A Girl's Best Friend (2007)
Blog Wars (2006)
Phantom of the Opera: Behind the Mask (2006)
Bom Bali (2006)
Surviving Katrina (2006)
Live 8: A Bittersweet Symphony (2005)
Israel and the Arabs: Elusive Peace (2005)
Catherine the Great (2005)
The Flight That Fought Back (2005)
"Geldof in Africa" (2005)
Gridlock (2005)
How We Fell for Europe (2005)
Live Aid Remembered (2005)
Spy Secrets (2004)
Ace in the Hole (2004)
Adolf Eichmann - Begegnungen mit einem Mörder (2003)
"Breast Health: New Hope" (2001)
Endgame in Ireland (2001)
"Queen Victoria's Empire" (2001)
Finest Hour: The Battle of Britain (2000)
Hostage (1999)
The Vietnam War: A Descent Into Hell (1999)

See also
 Brian Lapping
 Norma Percy

References

External links
 Brook Lapping — Official web site

Film production companies of the United Kingdom
Television production companies of the United Kingdom